The  was an area army of the Imperial Japanese Army during the Second Sino-Japanese War.

History
The Japanese North China Area Army was formed on August 21, 1937 under the control of the Imperial General Headquarters. It was transferred to the newly formed China Expeditionary Army on September 23, 1939. Headquartered in Beijing, it was responsible for direction and coordination of the Japanese military activity in all of north China. It was demobilized in Beijing at the surrender of Japan.

List of Commanders

Commanding officers

Chiefs of Staff

References

N
Military units and formations established in 1937
Military units and formations disestablished in 1945